Tecumseh was an American Thoroughbred racehorse. He won the 1885 Preakness Stakes.

References

Thoroughbred family A18
Racehorses bred in the United States
Racehorses trained in the United States
Preakness Stakes winners
1882 racehorse births
Godolphin Arabian sire line